While the Australia national cricket team was touring South Africa in February and March 1967, another Australian team captained by Les Favell toured New Zealand to play each of the six provinces and four matches against New Zealand, but these matches did not have Test status. The Australians won against Auckland and Otago but lost to Canterbury and in the first international match against New Zealand; the other six matches were drawn.

The loss to Canterbury was the first time Australia had ever lost a first-class match in New Zealand.

Team

 Les Favell (captain)
 Bob Bitmead
 Brian Booth
 Peter Burge
 Alan Connolly
 Ken Cunningham 
 Geoff Davies 
 Eric Freeman
 Allan Frost 
 John Gleeson 
 Barry Jarman
 Norm O'Neill 
 Peter Philpott 
 Paul Sheahan

It was a strong team: seven of the team had played Test cricket and three others later played in Tests. Some observers considered it a stronger team than the Australian Test team that was touring South Africa at the same time.

References

External links
 Australia in New Zealand 1966–67 at CricketArchive

Further reading
Don Neely & Richard Payne, Men in White: The History of New Zealand International Cricket, 1894–1985, Moa, Auckland, 1986, pp. 369–73.
A. G. Wiren, "Australians in New Zealand, 1967", Wisden Cricketers' Almanack 1968, pp. 875–88.

1967 in Australian cricket
1967 in New Zealand cricket
New Zealand cricket seasons from 1945–46 to 1969–70
1966-67
International cricket competitions from 1960–61 to 1970